This is a list non-Soviet citizens awarded the title Hero of the Soviet Union. Of over the 12,000 recipients of the title, 44 of them were foreign citizens.

Military personnel and partisans
 Zachari Zachariev
 Vladimir Zaimov
 Josef Buršík
 Otakar Jaroš
 Ján Nálepka
 Antonín Sochor
 Gustáv Husák
 
 Richard Tesařík
 Marcel Albert
 Jacques André
 Roland de La Poype
 
 Fritz Schmenkel
 Primo Gibelli
 Władysław Wysocki
 Juliusz Hibner
 Aniela Krzywoń
 Ramón Mercader
 Rubén Ruiz Ibárruri

Cosmonauts
 Abdul Ahad Mohmand
 Georgi Ivanov
 Aleksandar Panayotov Aleksandrov
 Arnaldo Tamayo Mendez
 Vladimír Remek
 Jean-Loup Chrétien
 Sigmund Jähn
 Bertalan Farkas
 Rakesh Sharma
 Jügderdemidiin Gürragchaa
 Mirosław Hermaszewski
 Dumitru Prunariu
 Muhammed Faris
 Phạm Tuân

Politicians
 Ahmed Ben Bella
 Todor Zhivkov
 Fidel Castro
 Ludvík Svoboda
 Abdel Hakim Amer
 Gamal Abdel Nasser
 Walter Ulbricht
 Erich Honecker
 Erich Mielke
 János Kádár

References 

 

Heroes of the Soviet Union lists